"Star-crossed" or "star-crossed lovers" is when two people are not able to be together for some type of reason. The term also has other meanings, but originally means that the pairing is being "thwarted by a malign star" or that the stars are working against the relationship. Astrological in origin, the phrase stems from the belief that the positions of the stars ruled over people's fates, and is best known from the play Romeo and Juliet by the Elizabethan playwright William Shakespeare. Such pairings are often said to be doomed from the start.

Definitions
The phrase was coined in the prologue of Shakespeare's Romeo and Juliet:

It also refers to destiny and the inevitability of the two characters' paths crossing. It usually but not always refers to unlucky outcomes, since Romeo and Juliet's affair ended tragically. Further, it connotes that the lovers entered into their union without sufficient forethought or preparation; that the lovers may not have had adequate knowledge of each other or that they were not thinking rationally.

(The original texts of the prologue, Q1 and Q2, use the spelling "starre-crost", but the version "star-cross'd" is normally used in modern versions.)

Classical examples

Examples of famous star-crossed lovers vary in written work. Pyramus and Thisbe are usually regarded as the source for Romeo and Juliet, and is featured in A Midsummer Night's Dream. Wuthering Heights, considered to be one of the greatest love stories in literary works, is a tale of all-encompassing and passionate, yet thwarted, love between the star-crossed Catherine Earnshaw and Heathcliff, and how this unresolved passion eventually destroys them and many around them.

In Virgil's Aeneid, the Trojan exile prince Aeneas and Dido, queen of Carthage, fall passionately in love – but the gods order Aeneas away to Italy and the spurned Dido commits suicide. Of course, Virgil's readers in Rome in the first century BC would know in advance that this love was doomed, since Aeneas' and Dido's progeny – respectively the Romans and the Carthagenians – would eventually become mortal enemies.

Lancelot, a trusted knight of King Arthur's Round Table, and Guinevere, the queen of Camelot and wife of Arthur, were involved in a star-crossed affair. In some versions of the tale, she is instantly smitten, and when they consummate their adulterous passion, it is an act which paves the way for the fall of Camelot and Arthur's death.

The legend of Tristan and Iseult (also known as Tristan and Isolde) is an influential romance and tragedy, retold in numerous sources with as many variations. The tragic story is of the adulterous love between the lovers. The narrative predates and most likely influenced the Arthurian romance of Lancelot and Guinevere, and has had a substantial impact on Western art and literature since it first appeared in the 12th century. While the details of the story differ from one author to another, the overall plot structure remains much the same.

Pedro of Portugal and Inês de Castro shared a true and tragic love in the Portuguese 14th century. The dramatic circumstances of their relationship, forbidden by Peter's father, King Afonso IV, Inês' murder at the orders of Afonso, Peter's bloody revenge on her killers and the legend of the coronation of her exhumed corpse by Peter, have turned their story into a frequent subject of art, music, and drama through the ages.

Hero and Leander is a Greek myth, relating the story of Hero (Greek: Ἡρώ), a priestess of Aphrodite who dwelt in a tower in Sestos, at the edge of the Hellespont, and Leander (Greek: Λέανδρος, Leandros), a young man from Abydos on the other side of the strait. Leander fell in love with Hero and would swim every night across the Hellespont to be with her. Hero would light a lamp at the top of her tower to guide his way.

Pelléas and Mélisande (French: Pelléas et Mélisande) is a Symbolist play by Maurice Maeterlinck about the forbidden, doomed love of the title characters. A classical myth, was a common subject for art during the Renaissance and Baroque eras.

Troilus and Cressida is a tragedy by Shakespeare, believed to have been written in 1602. The play (also described as one of Shakespeare's problem plays) is not a conventional tragedy, since its protagonist (Troilus) does not die. The play ends instead on a very bleak note with the death of the noble Trojan Hector and destruction of the love between Troilus and Cressida.

Venus and Adonis is a classical myth during the Renaissance.

Heer Ranjha is one of the four popular tragic romances of the Punjab.

Popocatépetl and Iztaccíhuatl refers to a number of mythical and folkloric explanations of the origins of the volcanoes Popocatépetl ("the Smoking Mountain") and Iztaccíhuatl ("white woman" in Nahuatl, sometimes called the Mujer Dormida "sleeping woman" in Spanish) which overlook the Valley of Mexico.

Layla and Majnun (by the Persian poet Nizami Ganjavi) is a classical Arabian love story. It is based on the real story of a young man called Qays ibn al-Mulawwah from the northern Arabian Peninsula, in the Umayyad era during the 7th century. There were two Arabic versions of the story at the time. In one version, he spent his youth together with Layla, tending their flocks. In the other version, upon seeing Layla he fell passionately in love with her. In both versions, however, he went mad when her father prevented him from marrying her; for that reason he came to be called Majnun Layla, which means "Driven mad by Layla". To him were attributed a variety of incredibly passionate romantic Arabic poems, considered among the foremost examples of the Udhari school.

The Butterfly Lovers is a Chinese legend about the tragic romance between two lovers, Liang Shanbo and Zhu Yingtai. The legend is sometimes regarded as the Chinese equivalent to Romeo and Juliet.

Other classic star-crossed lovers include Devdas and Paro (Parvati) in Devdas, Paris of Troy and Helen of Sparta in The Iliad, Oedipus and Jocasta in Oedipus Rex, Mark Antony and Cleopatra during the time of the Roman Empire, Khosrow and Shirin during the time of Sassanid Persia, Heloise and Peter Abelard during the Middle Ages, and Emperor Jahangir and Anarkali, Cyrano and Roxane in Cyrano de Bergerac, Hagbard and Signy, and Maratha Peshwa (Prime Minister) Bajirao and Mastani during the peak of Maratha Empire.

Modern examples

Prime time television has had various star-crossed lovers labeled as notable and "unforgettable" love stories. IGN considers Buffy Summers and Angel from Buffy the Vampire Slayer to be one of the genre's most tragic and notable star-crossed pairings. The Doctor bidding farewell to his companion Rose Tyler in Doctor Who has been named one of the greatest love scenes in science fiction. Cole Turner and Phoebe Halliwell from Charmed, Michael and Nikita from La Femme Nikita, Kara Thrace and Lee Adama from Battlestar Galactica, Clark Kent and Lana Lang from Smallville, as well as Lucas Scott and Peyton Sawyer from One Tree Hill are other star-crossed couples from the genre. Commander Lexa and Clarke Griffin from the TV series The 100 are also considered star-crossed lovers, as well as Nancy and Ace in Nancy Drew.

With film or within modern novels and books, such star-crossed couples as Jack Dawson and Rose DeWitt Bukater from Titanic, Landon Carter and Jamie Sullivan from "A Walk to Remember", Anakin Skywalker and Padmé Amidala from the Star Wars saga, Ennis Del Mar and Jack Twist from Brokeback Mountain, and Jake and Neytiri from Avatar have been included.

In soap opera, modern examples of star-crossed lovers have included couples such as Cliff Warner and Nina Cortlandt, JR Chandler and Babe Carey and Bianca Montgomery and Maggie Stone from All My Children. In 2008, a web-based reality soap opera was created based on the concept of being star-crossed. In Starcrossed, Fox News astrologer Greg Tufaro takes a couple in crisis and separates them for one cycle of the moon. Each is then set up with individuals who are a better match astrologically. The show puts the question "Is love written in the stars?" to the test with the couple deciding on the 28th day of their separation whether they will stay together or remain apart.

In comics, the decision of Marvel Comics to kill off Gwen Stacy, the girlfriend of Spider-Man, made the two of them into star-crossed lovers - though that was not the original intention.

Video games too have featured star-crossed couples across different genres, particularly role-playing video games: Cloud Strife and Aerith Gainsborough from Final Fantasy VII have been cited as a well-known star-crossed love story. Tidus and Yuna from Final Fantasy X have also been called star-crossed lovers. Zero and Iris from Mega Man X4 are another notable example.

See also
 Elopement
 Teenage tragedy song
 Unrequited love

References

Love
Shakespearean phrases
Romeo and Juliet